Het Menselyk Bedryf ("The Book of Trades") is an emblem book of 100 engravings by Jan Luyken and his son Caspar published in 1694, illustrating various trades in Amsterdam during the Dutch Golden Age. The majority of the trades shown are from the textile industry (12), followed by marine pursuits (8).
The book follows the moralist contemporary style of the then hugely popular emblem books of Jacob Cats, containing a moralistic poem per trade.

Trade titles by page number

	1	Baker	–	Backer	
	2	Tailor	–	Kleermaker	
	3	Carpenter	–	Timmerman	
	4	Bricklayer	–	Metselaar	
	5	Glazier	–	Glasemaaker	
	6	Plumber	–	Lootgieter	
	7	Cabinet-maker	–	Schrijnwerker	
	8	Brush-maker	–	Schuyermaaker	
	9	Broom-maker	–	Beesemmaaker	
	10	Basket-maker	–	Mandemaaker	
	11	Sieve maker	–	Seevemaaker	
	12	Chair-maker	–	Stoelemaaker	
	13	Spinner (thread twister)	–	Gaarentwynder	
	14	Silk maker	–	Syreeder	
	15	Wool-dresser	–	Wolbereider	
	16	Weaver	–	Weever	
	17	Cloth-shearer	–	Droogscheerder	
	18	Dyer	–	Veruwer	
	19	Shoemaker	–	Schoenmaaker	
	20	Comb maker	–	Kammemaaker	
	21	Optician	–	Brillemaaker	
	22	Needle maker	–	Naaldemaaker	
	23	Pin-maker	–	Speldemaaker	
	24	Gold-wire drawer	–	Gouddraadtrecker	
	25	Bronze-founder	–	Geelgieter	
	26	Tin-founder	–	Tinnegieter	
	27	Scales maker	–	Balansemaaker	
	28	Smith	–	Smit	
	29	Coppersmith	–	Kooperslaager	
	30	Lantern-maker	–	Lantaarenmaaker	
	31	Cutler	–	Messemaaker	
	32	Armourer	–	Swaardveeger	
	33	Gunsmith	–	Roeremaaker	
	34	Skate-maker	–	Schaatsemaaker	
	35	Pole-maker	–	Boommaaker	
	36	Cannon-maker	–	Pompemaaker	
	37	Ship's carpenter	–	Scheepstimmerman	
	38	Rope maker	–	Lyndraaier	
	39	Sail-maker	–	Seilemaaker	
	40	Cooper	–	Kuiper	
	41	Oil-maker	–	Olislaager	
	42	Candle-maker	–	Kaarsemaaker	
	43	Butcher	–	Vleeshouwer	
	44	Pastry-chef	–	Pasteibacker	
	45	Confectioner (Sugar manufacture)	–	Suikerbacker	
	46	Apothecary	–	Apotheeker	
	47	Gardener (Horticulturist)	–	Hovenier	
	48	Miller	–	Moolenaar	
	49	Brewer	–	Brouwer	
	50	Grocer	–	Grutter	

	51	Wagonwright	–	Waagemaaker	
	52	Saddler	–	Saalemaaker	
	53	Bellows-maker	–	Blaasbalckemaaker	
	54	Turner	–	Draaier	
	55	Instrument-maker	–	Instrumentmaaker	
	56	Barber-surgeon	–	Chirurgyn	
	57	Wig-maker	–	Pruikemaaker	
	58	Hatter	–	Hoedemaaker	
	59	Tanner	–	Leerbereider	
	60	Paper maker	–	Papiermaaker	
	61	Book-printer	–	Boeckdrucker	
	62	Copperplate printer	–	Plaatdrucker	
	63	Bookbinder	–	Boeckbinder	
	64	Schoolmaster	–	Schoolmeester	
	65	Clockmaker	–	Orlosimaaker	
	66	Mirror-maker	–	Spiegelmaaker	
	67	Glass-blower	–	Glasblaaser	
	68	Bleacher (for linen and wool)	–	Bleeker	
	69	Stone-sawyer	–	Steensager	
	70	Stonemason	–	Steenhouwer	
	71	Brick-maker	–	Tichgellaar	
	72	Potter	–	Pottebacker	
	73	Glue maker (for furniture and sizing)	–	Lymmaaker	
	74	Peat-cutter	–	Veender	
	75	Miner	–	Bergwercker	
	76	Minter (coin maker)	–	Munter	
	77	Goldbeater	–	Goudslager	
	78	Silversmith	–	Silversmit	
	79	Goldsmith	–	Goudsmit	
	80	Diamond-cutter	–	Diamantslyper	
	81	Pearl hole-maker	–	Peerelgaater	
	82	Embroiderer	–	Borduurder	
	83	Tapestry-maker	–	Tapeitwerker	
	84	Painter	–	Schilder	
	85	Engraver	–	Plaatsnyder	
	86	Sculptor	–	Beeldhouwer	
	87	Musician	–	Musikant	
	88	Astrologer	–	Astrologist	
	89	Lawyer	–	Advokaat	
	90	Chemist	–	Scheider	
	91	Doctor (Physician)	–	Docter	
	92	Teacher (Preacher)	–	Leeraar	
	93	Farmer (Landowner)	–	Landman	
	94	Sailor	–	Zeeman	
	95	Fisherman	–	Visser	
	96	Hunter	–	Jaager	
	97	Merchant (Banker)	–	Koopman	
	98	Soldier (Officer)	–	Krygsman	
	99	Ruler (Prince)	–	Heerscher	
	100	Grave-digger	–	Doodgraaver

External links
 Engravings from Spiegel van het Menselyk Bedryf, "The Book of Trades"
 Information about Jan Luyken in the digital library of Dutch Literature – DBNL

1694 books
Dutch art
17th-century engravings
Dutch non-fiction books
Emblem books